is the Japanese term for ornamental cherry blossom trees and their blossoms.

Sakura may also refer to:

 Sakura, raw horse meat, usually prepared as sashimi called basashi
 Sakura catalog, a Japanese stamp catalog illustrated in colors

Places
 , a city in Japan
 , a city in Japan formed on March 28, 2005
 , a district in the city of Saitama, Japan
 , a Japanese feudal domain located in Shimōsa Province
 , a place name in Tokyo
 Sakura Square, a plaza in Denver, Colorado

People and characters
 Sakura (name), a Japanese given name (and list of individuals and fictional characters with that name)
 Mansa Sakura (1285–1300), emperor of the Mali empire

Business
 The Sakura Bank, a Japanese bank based in Tokyo and Kobe
 Sakura (train), the name of several different train services in Japan
 The Tokyo Sakura Tram (officially Toden Arakawa Line) is a tram service in Tokyo, Japan
 Sakura Color Products Corporation, a Japanese pen manufacturer
 Sakura Lounge, the airport lounge of Japan Airlines
 Sakura (cigarette), produced and sold exclusively in Japan, by Japan Tobacco

Sport
 Sakura, a common nickname for Japanese Women's national sports teams:
 Japan women's national field hockey team 
 Japan women's national rugby union team

Film and TV
 Sakura (NHK), a 2002 Japanese TV morning show drama
 Sakura Wars, a Japanese media franchise
 Dragon Zakura, a Japanese manga and a TV drama based on the manga
 Cardcaptor Sakura, a Japanese manga and anime
 Sakura Haruno, a main character in the manga and anime series Naruto

Music
 Sakura (musician) (born 1969), Japanese musician whose main instrument is the drums
 Sakura, a 1998 album by Southern All Stars
 Sakura (album), 1999 electronic album by Susumu Yokota
 Sakura-Variationen, a trio by Helmut Lachenmann (2000)

Songs
 "Sakura Sakura", a traditional Japanese song
 "Sakura" (Arashi song), 2015
 "Sakura" (Ayaka song), 2018
 "Sakura" (Ikimono-gakari song), 2006
 "Sakura" (Lead song), 2014
 "Sakura" (Saori@destiny song), 2008
 "Sakura", by Capsule from High Collar Girl, 2001
 "Sakura", by Da Pump, 2019
 "Sakura", by Ketsumeishi, 2005
 "Sakura", by Naotarō Moriyama, 2003
 "Sakura", by Nirgilis, used in the anime Eureka Seven, 2006
 "Sakura", by Rosalía from Motomami, 2022

Ships 
Japanese ship Sakura list of ships named Sakura

See also
 Cherry Blossom (disambiguation)
 Ōka (disambiguation)